James Arthur Sinclair (born 31 July 1957) is a Scottish former footballer who made over 350 appearances in the Scottish League, most notably for Queen's Park and Clyde. He also played for Queen of the South, Stirling Albion and Hamilton Academical. Sinclair later entered youth coaching with the Scottish Football Association, Rangers and Queen's Park and briefly served as assistant manager at Aston Villa.

Honours 
Queen's Park
 Scottish League Second Division: 1980–81
Clyde
 Scottish League Second Division: 1981–82
Hamilton Academical
 Scottish League First Division: 1985–86

References

Scottish footballers
Scottish Football League players
Queen's Park F.C. players
Association football wingers
1957 births
Footballers from Glasgow
Association football forwards
Clyde F.C. players
Stirling Albion F.C. players
Hamilton Academical F.C. players
Queen of the South F.C. players
Rangers F.C. non-playing staff
Queen's Park F.C. non-playing staff
Aston Villa F.C. non-playing staff
Living people